Caprus is a town of ancient Greece.

Caprus or Kapros may also refer to:
Caprus (island), an island of ancient Chalcidice, Macedonia, Greece
Caprus (river), a river of ancient Mesopotamia
Caprus, a small stream near Laodicea on the Lycus